Chemical Wedding may refer to:

Literature 
Chymical Wedding of Christian Rosenkreutz, a 1616 book of alchemical lore
The Chymical Wedding, a 1989 novel by Lindsay Clarke

Music 
The Chemical Wedding (Bruce Dickinson album), 1998
The Chemical Wedding (Danielle Dax album), 1987
Chemical Wedding (Seattle band), 2007

Other 
Chemical Wedding (film), a 2008 film